May 1994 PUK–KDP clashes was the first outbreak of violence of the 1994–97 Iraqi Kurdish Civil War, fought in Iraqi Kurdistan between the rival Kurdistan Democratic Party and Patriotic Union of Kurdistan Kurdish factions. The clashes left around 300 people dead. The clashes saw the PUK capture the towns of Shaqlawa and Chamchamal from the KDP.

References

1994 in Iraq
Conflicts in 1994